Quasillites is a fossil genus of ostracod from the Devonian and Carboniferous Periods.

Description
Quasillites is distinguished from other ostracodes by the presence of a "medial spot" on each valve. The surface of each valve is covered in longitudinal, bifurcating ridges, which curve and resemble a finger print. The ribs and spines on the carapace are in front of the posterior margin, and are similar to those of other ostracods such as Bufina, Parabufina, and Healdia. In fact, this comparison can also be drawn for all Quasillitids to other Healdiids. The muscle scars on each valve is circular in shape, and some specimens have smaller secondary scars.

Distribution
Devonian examples of Quasillites, such as Q. lobatus, Q. obliquus, Q. subobliquus, and Q. angulatus, are known from shales and claystones in northern New York, Eastern Ohio, central Pennsylvania.  Other species such as Q. fromelennensis and a second informal species can also be found in Limestones of northern France, near the city of Calais. This genus has also been found in the Lower Carboniferous edge of the Illinois Basin; in central Indiana.

References

Podocopida genera
Quasillitidae
Prehistoric ostracod genera
Devonian animals
Late Devonian animals
Carboniferous animals
Fossils of France
Fossils of the United States